The Alohilani Resort Waikiki Beach is a resort hotel located in Honolulu, Hawai'i on Waikīkī Beach. The 'Alohilani opened in 2018, having 839 guest rooms and suites, an infinity pool, a 280,000 gallon, 3-story high oceanarium and two restaurants by "Iron Chef" Masaharu Morimoto.

History 
Residing on land that belongs to Queen Liliuokalani's Trust and named after one of her beachside cottages, the property underwent a $125 million redevelopment, officially opening on May 8, 2018. 'Alohilani means "heavenly brightness" or "royal light". In September 2019, the Queen Liliuokalani Trust sold the land beneath the hotel for $195 million to Safehold Inc., a real estate investment trust affiliated with iStar Financial. On September 8, 2021, the hotel became the first in Hawaii to require COVID-19 vaccinations for workers, going into effect on October 15.

Notable features 
Two of the property's restaurants – Morimoto Asia Waikiki and Momosan Waikiki – are creations of Masaharu Morimoto, best known as an "Iron Chef" on the Japanese television cooking shows Iron Chef and its spinoff Iron Chef America.

The resort's lobby houses a 280,000 gallon, 3-story high oceanarium (saltwater aquarium) featuring more than 1,000 indigenous marine life and coral reef formations.

There is a heated saltwater infinity pool.

There are two full-size, rooftop tennis courts on property.

Nonprofit initiative 
'Alohilani has pledged to plant 100,000 native trees across O'ahu and the Big Island in partnership with Hawaiian Legacy Reforestation Initiative, a Hawaii-based nonprofit organization committed to returning indigenous trees back to Hawai'i.

References

External links
 

Hotels in Honolulu
Waikiki
Hotels established in 2018
2018 establishments in Hawaii